Red bush may refer to:

Rooibos, a type of plant
Red Bush, Indiana
Red Bush, Kentucky
Redbush, Kentucky